Georges Freiburghaus (born 11 July 1927) was a Swiss weightlifter. He competed in the men's middleweight event at the 1960 Summer Olympics.

References

External links
 

1927 births
Possibly living people
Swiss male weightlifters
Olympic weightlifters of Switzerland
Weightlifters at the 1960 Summer Olympics
Sportspeople from the canton of Bern